Also known as Kpete, Kwete is the alcoholic beverage brewed particularly by the Lugbara people of Uganda and DR Congo. The production process involves mixing fermented sorghum, millet or maize, malt, boiled water and yeast which is locally called Aku fi. 

In West Nile markets, this traditional beer is usually sold and consumed in a calabash (locally called Icereke) but can also be bought in any container.

Other producers
Kwete is also produced in Kampala and the rest of Uganda. Top quality Kwete is creamish to light brown in colour, with a thick consistent sweet-sour taste. Production involves millet grains being soaked for 24 - 48 hours. Then, they are germinated for 48 - 72 hours and sun dried for about 48 hours before souring in a container sealed at the top. Next, roasting of sourdough is done on a large rectangular metallic tray before mashing and fermentation. Finally, filtering with a special cloth is done for a smooth tasting uniform-coloured drink.

The Pojulu people of South Sudan also sell an alcohol by the same name and so do the Bukusu tribe of Kenya.

See also

 Lugbara cuisine
 Tonto (beverage)

Fermented drinks
Democratic Republic of the Congo cuisine
Drugs in the Democratic Republic of the Congo
Ugandan cuisine
Alcohol in Uganda